Pardos is a municipality in the province of Guadalajara, Castile-La Mancha, Spain. The municipality had 23.15 km2 and a population of 50 inhabitants at the time of the 2013 census (INE).

References

Municipalities in the Province of Guadalajara